The Las Vegas Plaza is a plaza and historic district in Las Vegas, New Mexico. The plaza was originally laid out in 1835 by Mexican settlers and is surrounded by a number of historically and architecturally notable buildings. It was listed in the National Register of Historic Places in 1974.

History
Las Vegas was established in 1835 after a group of settlers received a land grant from the Mexican government. The town was laid out in the traditional Spanish Colonial style, with a central plaza surrounded by adobe buildings which could serve as fortifications in case of attack. Las Vegas soon prospered as a stop on the Santa Fe Trail. During the Mexican–American War in 1846, Stephen W. Kearny delivered an address at the plaza from atop what is thought to be the surviving Dice Apartments building, claiming New Mexico for the United States. In 1854, visiting attorney W. W. H. Davis wrote that the plaza "more resembled a muddy field than a public square, and all sorts of four-footed domestic animals were roaming at large over it."

Las Vegas prospered with the arrival of the railroad in 1880, and many of the one-story adobe buildings surrounding the plaza were replaced by larger and grander structures like the Italianate style Plaza Hotel and Ilfeld Building. During this period, the plaza itself was cleared of livestock and wagons and converted to a tidy public park with trees, fences, and a bandstand.

Notable buildings
Contributing properties in the Plaza historic district include 
Plaza Hotel, built 1880
Charles Ilfeld Building, built 1882
Dice Apartments, the oldest surviving building on the plaza
John D. Veeder Building
Exchange Hotel, built 1850 (only one wing extant)
Romero Mercantile Company Building
First National Bank Building, built 1880

See also

National Register of Historic Places listings in San Miguel County, New Mexico

References

External links

Las Vegas, New Mexico
National Register of Historic Places in San Miguel County, New Mexico
Historic districts on the National Register of Historic Places in New Mexico